The 2008–09 Guinness Premiership was the 22nd season of the top flight of the English domestic rugby union competitions, played between September 2008 and May 2009. Round 1 included the London Double Header at Twickenham, between the four London teams.

This season saw the introduction of the controversial ELVs, although only 13 of the rules were used, as opposed to the 30 that were trialled in the Super 14.

The previous season
Northampton Saints gained promotion to the league this season by finishing top of the National Division One, taking the place of Leeds Carnegie who were relegated. In 2007–2008, Gloucester RFC finished top of the league but were beaten by Leicester Tigers in the semi-finals. London Wasps went on to beat Leicester Tigers 26–16 in the final.

Season synopsis
Leicester Tigers finished top of the league table, then were crowned Champions after defeating Bath 24–10 in the semi-final and London Irish 10–9 in the final at Twickenham.

Going into the season, the top six clubs were all assured of berths in the 2009–10 Heineken Cup. By advancing to the final of the 2008–09 competition, Leicester secured a seventh place for England. The four Premiership semi-finalists—Leicester, Harlequins, London Irish, and Bath—plus Sale Sharks and Gloucester secured Heineken Cup berths. The seventh berth was secured by Northampton Saints when they defeated French side Bourgoin in the European Challenge Cup final on 22 May. The remaining clubs that will compete in the 2009–10 Premiership will compete in the 2009–10 Challenge Cup.

The club that finishes bottom of the table is relegated and replaced by the club that tops the second-level National Division One. This season, Bristol were relegated, to be replaced by Leeds Carnegie, which won promotion at the first opportunity.

Teams
Northampton Saints, having won the 2007–08 National Division One, replaced Leeds Carnegie, who were relegated last season after finishing bottom of the table.

Notes

Table

Results

Round 1

Round 2

Round 3

Round 4

Round 5

Round 6

Round 7

Round 8

Round 9

Round 10

Round 11

Round 12

Rearranged fixtures

Round 13

Round 14

Round 15

Round 16

Round 17

Round 18

Round 19

Rearranged fixtures

Round 20

Round 21

Round 22

Play-offs

Semi-finals

Final

Total Season Attendances

Top scorers

Note: Flags to the left of player names indicate national team as has been defined under World Rugby eligibility rules, or primary nationality for players who did not earn international senior caps. Players may hold one or more non-WR nationalities.

Most points 
Source:

Most tries
Source:

Notes

External links
 Official site
 Match Attendance figure

 
2008-09
 
England